Yao Jingyuan (Chinese: 姚景远; born 1958 in Yingkou, Liaoning) is a male Chinese weightlifter. He won a gold medal at 1984 Olympic Games in men's 67.5 kg.

References 
China Daily.com

1958 births
Living people
Chinese male weightlifters
Olympic weightlifters of China
Weightlifters at the 1984 Summer Olympics
Olympic gold medalists for China
Olympic medalists in weightlifting
Medalists at the 1984 Summer Olympics
Asian Games medalists in weightlifting
Weightlifters from Liaoning
People from Yingkou
Weightlifters at the 1982 Asian Games
Weightlifters at the 1986 Asian Games
Asian Games gold medalists for China
Medalists at the 1982 Asian Games
Medalists at the 1986 Asian Games
20th-century Chinese people